The Makaretu River is a river of the southern Hawke's Bay region of New Zealand's North Island. One of numerous roughly parallel rivers, it flows east from the slopes of the Ruahine Range north of Dannevirke, passing close to the township of Takapau before meeting the waters of the Tukituki River just to the west of Waipukurau.

There are also at least two rivers in New Zealand called "Makaretu Stream".

See also
List of rivers of New Zealand

References

Rivers of the Hawke's Bay Region
Rivers of New Zealand